Ynys Bery is a small island south of Ramsey Island, Pembrokeshire, Wales, in the community of St David's and the Cathedral Close.

Etymology 
The island's name in Welsh means falcon's Island, according to an 1852 book, but an earlier work of 1811 by Richard Fenton calls it the kite's island.

History 
Fenton, in 1811, describes the island, and its neighbour Ynys y Cantwr: 

In 1903, the S.S. Graffoe (a 2,996-ton steamship bound from Glasgow to Montevideo with 3,800 tons of coal) struck Ramsey Island and sank at the northern end of Ynys Bery. The wreck lies at a depth of 15 metres, and is one of many Pembrokeshire wrecks popular with divers.

Geography
Ynys Bery's highest point is 71 metres (233 feet), the highest of Wales's islets.

Flora and fauna
Together with neighbouring Ynys Cantwr, Ynys Bery is a breeding ground for lesser black-backed gulls. In the spring the island is covered with pale blue squill.

Notes

References

External links 

Islands of Pembrokeshire
Uninhabited islands of Wales